The Bank of England Building is a Grade I listed building located in Liverpool, England.

History
The Bank of England first decided to open premises on Castle Street, Liverpool in 1826, which helped establish the area as the city's financial centre.

The present building was designed by Charles Robert Cockerell and built in a Neoclassical style between 1845 and 1848. The building was constructed as one of three branch banks for the Bank of England in the mid-19th century.

The building was used entirely by the bank and did not contain any lettable space to other businesses, which were being fast established in the district. Subsequently, Cockerell built a similar building in Cook Street for this purpose. It was demolished in 1959.

Architecture
The building combines several neoclassical architectural styles, including Greek, Roman and Renaissance. The most evident of these is Greek, with four Doric style columns 'tying' the ground and first floors together. The building itself is raised up from ground level, sitting atop a rough granite plinth.

The front of the building held accommodation for the bank's agent, accessible from Union Court. The sub-agent had a similar layout at the rear.

Despite only being three bays wide and seven bays deep, the building's design was seen to give it an "overwhelmingly massive and powerful" appearance. The building is regarded as one of Cockerell's most impressive and was described by Nikolaus Pevsner as a "masterpiece of Victorian architecture". and by the National Heritage List for England as "one of Cockerell's richest and most inventive buildings." It was Grade I listed on 28 June 1952.

See also

 Bank of England
 Architecture of Liverpool

References

External links
 
 Bank of England on Viewfinder

Grade I listed buildings in Liverpool
Grade I listed banks
Neoclassical architecture in Liverpool
Unused buildings in Liverpool